The 1943 Illinois Fighting Illini football team was an American football team that represented the University of Illinois during the 1943 Big Ten Conference football season.  In their second season under head coach Ray Eliot, the Illini compiled a 3–7 record and finished in sixth place in the Big Ten Conference. Halfback Eddie Bray was selected as the team's most valuable player.

Schedule

References

Illinois
Illinois Fighting Illini football seasons
Illinois Fighting Illini football